Nightmare of Eden is the fourth serial of the 17th season of the British science fiction television series Doctor Who, which was first broadcast in four weekly parts on BBC1 from 24 November to 15 December 1979.

The serial is set on the interstellar cruise ship Empress. In the serial, drug smugglers try to smuggle the deadly drug Vraxoin on the ship contained in alien beings called the Mandrels.

Plot

The TARDIS arrives near an unstable area on the interstellar cruise ship Empress, which has emerged from hyperspace at the same co-ordinates as the trade ship Hecate, causing a dimensional crossover that the Fourth Doctor and Romana realise must be repaired. The Doctor offers his services to detach the two craft. Rigg, captain of the Empress, is suspicious of the Doctor's alias as a representative of Galactic Salvage but nevertheless agrees to let him try and separate the two craft by reversing the smaller craft at full thrust. The Doctor is accompanied by Rigg's co-pilot, Secker, who, it becomes apparent, is a drug addict. He is addicted to Vraxoin, the origins of which are unknown, but is known to be lethal. Secker heads off alone into the unstable area and is attacked by a clawed monster and left for dead. K9 arrives from the TARDIS and is tasked with cutting through the locked ships.

Also aboard the Empress are a zoologist named Tryst and his assistant Della, with their CET (Continual Event Transmuter) Machine, which stores portions of planets on electro-magnetic crystals. Their collection is large and ethically dubious. Their most recent stop was on the planet Eden where one of their expedition was killed, but both Tryst and Della are reluctant to provide too many details. Romana, however, examines the Eden projection when she is on her own and is sure she has seen eyes staring out at her from the dark and forbidding jungle. When she later looks at the projection again an insect appears from within it and stings her.

The Doctor and Rigg find the wounded Secker and send him to the sickbay where he dies. When the Doctor finds Secker's drugs stash he is prevented from acting when someone stuns him and steals the evidence. Once he has recovered, he returns with Rigg and K9 to cut through the power source. Once a hole is made a roaring creature appears, flexing its vicious claws.

K9 repels the creature with blaster fire while the Doctor and Rigg refit the craft. The Doctor continues to try to separate the two ships while also trying to source the Vraxoin on the craft. Rigg is positive there are no drugs there, but he is later proven wrong. When Romana wakes up an unseen hand spikes her refresher drink with the drug, but Rigg ends up drinking it. He starts to show signs of addiction and altered perception and heads off alone as his cravings grow.

After the Doctor and K9 fail once more to separate the ships, he spots a silver-suited stranger and pursues him through the passenger deck and into the blurred area between ships. The Doctor loses his quarry, but manages to relieve him of a radiation band, which proves that he was on Tryst's expeditionary team. The clawed monsters are loose near there. When the Doctor flees back to the Empress he discovers Rigg has become addicted and Tryst accuses Della of smuggling Vraxoin, in league with her late partner Stott, who was killed on Eden. Two Azurian Customs and Excise officers now board the craft, Fisk and Costa, and start to suspect the Doctor of smuggling because of the traces of Vraxoin in his pocket. The Doctor and Romana make a break for it and head to the CET Machine room where they evade capture by leaping directly into the projection.

Inside the projection, the Doctor and Romana are menaced by jungle plants and must hide to avoid the clawed monsters, which obviously originate from Eden and roam freely in this section of the planet. They meet up with the fugitive previously sighted by them both, Stott, who takes them to his sheltered cubicle. It seems that he is a Major in the Intelligence Section of the Space Corps and has been hiding in the projection for the past 183 days while he tries to establish the source of the Vraxoin, which he knows is from Eden but not from which organic source. He also names the creatures as Mandrels. The trio exit the projection and return to find the Empress under siege from the marauding beasts, which have now started killing the passengers. Rigg attacks Romana, hoping to find Vraxoin on her, but is killed by Fisk.

The Doctor, Romana, and K9 evade the creatures while trying once more to separate the two spacecraft. The Doctor incinerates one of the Mandrels, which disintegrates into raw Vraxoin: The beasts are the source of the drug. He reapplies himself to the technical task and, with the help of his companions, the ships are finally parted – but the Doctor disappears from the Empress in the process.

The separation has been a success, with the elusive Dymond having returned to his own craft at the right time. Fisk warns him not to leave too quickly, but Dymond is keen to get away. The Doctor is also on the Hecate, having been caught up in the separation of the two ships, and, without being noticed, soon finds evidence of Dymond's complicity in the drug running project. Dymond returns to the Empress by shuttle, and the Doctor smuggles himself on board. Back on the Empress, Romana finds Della and confides in her that Stott is still alive, but Della is soon arrested by the Customs men and they are separated.

The Doctor rejoins Romana on the Empress and says he has seen evidence that the smugglers are planning to use a laser to transport the Eden projection between the two crafts. He is now certain that Dymond's ally is Tryst and, when Stott arrives, he also confirms the source of the Vraxoin. Fisk and Costa turn up to arrest the Doctor, but Stott pulls rank and warns them to back off. In another part of the craft, Tryst is reunited with Della and confesses all about his part in the smuggling racket. She flees when a Mandrel arrives and distracts Tryst, who is rapidly trying to escape with Dymond. They head back to the Hecate.

The Doctor has meanwhile rounded up the Mandrels using K9's dog whistle, having worked out they are pacified by ultrasonics. He leads them back into the projection and then slips out, leaving the creatures trapped. His next task is to reverse the CET transfer process to stop the smugglers getting away with the Vraxoin supply. After allowing Tryst and Dymond to transport the Eden projection to the Hecate, he activates the CET and traps them within a new projection – they are ready for the Customs Officers to walk in and arrest them. With the ships separated and the drug runners caught, the Doctor and friends slip away back to the TARDIS with the Eden project. They restore everything to their home planets and can only hope no one else discovers the secret of the Mandrels.

Production
It was the final Doctor Who serial written by Bob Baker, who worked on it alone, rather than with his usual writing partner Dave Martin.

Alan Bromly is credited with directing this story, but he quit partway through filming as a result of a vehement dispute with Tom Baker. As a result, producer Graham Williams wound up having to complete the director's duties uncredited. The unpleasantness of this whole incident led Williams to decide that he wished to leave the series. Bromly never directed another story for the series and retired soon afterwards.

Broadcast and reception

The British tabloid newspaper The Sun wrote that the Mandrels were terrifying monsters, as no publicity shots had been taken for them (which, as later reported, was untrue). However, the majority of critics were more scathing and many of them saw the Mandrels as being thoroughly unconvincing (particularly the Doctor Who Appreciation Society, which described them as "cute rejects from The Muppet Show"). Writer Bob Baker on the recent DVD release also expressed his disappointment with the Mandrel design.

Mark Braxton of Radio Times considered the serial to be "something of a flawed diamond". Braxton noted that the sets were "perfectly decent, for the most part" but thought the Mandrels were "the least frightening monster the show ever produced." The review concluded by stating "Overall, this sobering, sideways take on Paradise Lost deserves respect, in conception and narrative if not always in the finished product."

MM Gilroy-Sinclair of Starburst said the show was "a story with some big ideas and some shoddy production values." He was unimpressed by the Mandrels and the "plodding" story but praised the performances of Tom Baker and Lalla Ward. Despite his criticisms, Gilroy-Sinclair ended his review by stating "it actually has some wonderful moments, it is surprisingly mature; it’s clever and has some fabulous acting."

Cultbox's Malcolm Stewart described the serial as "Serious-minded but facetiously performed". However, he also stated that "For all the deficiencies in presentation, Nightmare of Eden is still a story with real science and genuine imagination at its heart."

Commercial releases

In print

Terrance Dicks' novelisation was published by Target Books in August 1980.

Home media
It was released on VHS in January 1999 and on DVD on 2 April 2012. It was scheduled to be released as part of the Doctor Who DVD Files in Issue 134 on 19 February 2014.

References

External links

Target novelisation

Fourth Doctor serials
Doctor Who serials novelised by Terrance Dicks
1979 British television episodes
Television series set in the 22nd century